Raybaudia is a genus of sea snails, marine gastropod molluscs in the family Cypraeidae, the cowries.

Species
 Raybaudia joycae (Clover, 1970)
 Raybaudia porteri (C. N. Cate, 1966)

References

  Lorenz, F., 2002. New worldwide cowries. Descriptions of new taxa and revisions of selected groups of living Cypraeidae (Mollusca: Gastropoda). Schriften zur Malakozoologie 20: 292 pp
 Lorenz, F. (2017). Cowries. A guide to the gastropod family Cypraeidae. Volume 1, Biology and systematics. Harxheim: ConchBooks. 644 pp.

Cypraeidae
Gastropod genera